Quadri is a surname. Notable people with the surname include:

 Alberto Quadri (born 1983), Italian footballer
 Argeo Quadri (1911 – 2004), Italian conductor 
 Sayeed Quadri (born 1960),  Indian lyricist and poet who works in Bollywood

See also 

 Quadri (disambiguation)
 Qaderi